Ezell's Famous Chicken is a Seattle fast food restaurant. The first restaurant was opened on February 3, 1984, in Seattle's Central District neighborhood, near Garfield High School. The restaurant chain has 12 other locations in the Puget Sound region, including a location on the Microsoft campus in Redmond that opened in 2006.  In 2015, the chain opened its Spokane location, its first restaurant outside of Western Washington. The first international location for Ezell's opened in June 2015, in Sharjah, United Arab Emirates. The Sharjah location has since closed.

Ezell's was made famous when talk show host Oprah Winfrey called it her favorite fried chicken.  There are a number of photos of her on the wall in the original Seattle location proclaiming her love of the chicken.  It is also said she has the chicken flown to her in Chicago when she has a craving.

History

The restaurant was founded by Ezell Stephens and Lewis Rudd, opening its first location on February 3, 1984, in the Central District. The pair, from Scottsville, Texas, discussed opening a restaurant in 1978 after Ezell left the Coast Guard and Lewis left the Army. Stephens and Rudd attended night school and later earned a loan from the Small Business Administration to open their store. A second location was opened in the University District in 1988, but closed in 1994 after financial problems. A second round of expansion began in 1998.

In 2021, Ezell's launched a "R.U.B.B. (Raising Up Black Businesses) Initiative", offering 20 inaugural grants of $2,500 each to Black-owned businesses or organizations in Washington state. The Initiative expanded to include a leadership conference the following year.

Departure of Ezell Stephens

Following a contentious lawsuit filed by Ezell Stephens, he left the company he started with his business partners Lewis and Faye. Ezell opened three restaurants in Everett, Lake City, and Renton, Washington. In November 2011, Ezell Stephens changed the name of his three locations to Heaven Sent Fried Chicken, because in the lawsuit he lost the name, but kept his recipe.  In February 2019, the Renton location of Heaven Sent closed.

See also
 List of fast-food chicken restaurants

References

External links
 Ezell's website
 Heaven Sent Fried Chicken

African-American history in Seattle
Black-owned restaurants in the United States
Central District, Seattle
Fast-food poultry restaurants
Restaurants established in 1984
Restaurants in Seattle
Chicken chains of the United States
American companies established in 1984
1984 establishments in Washington (state)